Kim Young-Hoo (born March 11, 1983) is a South Korean footballer who plays as a striker. 

Kim began his career at Korea National League side Ulsan Hyundai Mipo Dockyard. He won the National League top scorer in his first season. After two seasons in Ulsan he won the second National League top scorer with 31 goals.

On November 18, 2008, Kim was as one of sixteen priority member, join Gangwon FC. So from 2009, He moved to newly formed Gangwon FC as founding member with former Ulsan Hyundai Mipo Dockyard manager Choi Soon-Ho.

In January 2019, Kim retired from playing football.

Club career

Ulsan Hyundai Mipo Dolphin
Originally, Kim applied for 2006 K-League draft, but he wasn't nominated by any team. So, Kim started his career at Ulsan Hyundai Mipo Dolphin, a National league side as a rookie. In 2006 season, which was his first season as a professional, he won the Rookie of the Year and the top scorer with 19 goals.

He missed half of 2007 season through injury. Nonetheless injury, he scored 10 goals in 14 games. In 2007 Korea National League Championship playoff second leg, Ulsan Mipo secured league winner by his two goals. Kim won the MVP of championship playoff.

2008 season was best season in his National League career. Kim won his second top scorer title by 31 goals. It was 1.97 goal ratio per games. He made the biggest impact in 2008 season, so Ulsan's manager Choi Soon-Ho took him and some of his teammates to Gangwon FC, a newly formed football club.

Gangwon FC
Kim became K-Leaguer as he joined Gangwon FC. In his first K-League game against Jeju United he assisted Gangwon's winning goal scored by Yoon Jun-Ha. A 3–3 draw with Chunnam Dragons, saw his first goal and second goal in K-League on April 12, 2009. From June he scored 9 goals in 9 consecutive games. He was also selected K-League all-star due to his good performance. He is nominated 2009 K-League Rookie of the Year. He had three assists in the match against Jeonbuk Hyundai Motors on September 10, 2010.

Police
After 2011 season, Kim went to Police for military duty. He returned to Gangwon at the end of the 2013 season.

Club career statistics 

Note 1: 2013 season's appearance in Gangwon is including 1 game of Relegation Play-off.
Note 2: League Cup included Korean League Cup, Korea National League Championship.

Honours

Club
Ulsan Hyundai Mipo Dockyard
 Korea National League (2): 2007, 2008
 Korean President's Cup (1): 2008
 K2 League Cup Runner-up (1): 2006

Individual
Ulsan Hyundai Mipo Dockyard
 Korea National League Rookie of the Year: 2006
 Korea National League Top scorer (2): 2006 (19 goals), 2008 (31 goals)
 Korea National League Championship playoff MVP: 2007
 Windsor Awards Best Eleven: 2008

Gangwon FC
 K-League All-Star: 2009
 K-League Rookie of the Year: 2009

References

External links
 

1983 births
Ansan Mugunghwa FC players
Association football forwards
China League One players
Expatriate footballers in China
Gangwon FC players
K League 1 players
K League 2 players
Korea National League players
Living people
Shenzhen F.C. players
South Korean expatriate sportspeople in China
South Korean footballers
Footballers from Seoul
Ulsan Hyundai Mipo Dockyard FC players